is a Japanese actress and singer from Oita Prefecture, Japan.

Biography
Mori was born in Osaka on August 31, 2001 and brought up in Ōita. In 2016, she was scouted by the talent agency ARBRE.

In 2021, she signed a contract with SMA (Sony Music Artists).

Filmography

Film

Television

Radio work

Discography

Singles

Accolades

References

External links
  
 

2001 births
Living people
Japanese actresses
Japanese film actresses
Japanese television actresses
Japanese voice actresses
Seiyu Award winners
Voice actresses from Ōita Prefecture
21st-century Japanese actresses